Philip G. Kreyenbroek (born 1948) is a Dutch academic specialising in Iranian studies. Throughout his career, he has published several books and articles on the Zoroastrian, Kurdish, and Yazidi traditions.

Education 
From 1966 he studied Persian, Arabic and Turkish at the University of Amsterdam from where he obtained a BSc in 1970. He transferred to the University of Utrecht, from where he received an MSc Iranian studies in 1972. Granted with a scholarship by the British Council, he then followed up on his studies at the School of Oriental and African Studies (SOAS) at the University of London, where he studied Zoroastrianism, Gujarati and the Iranian language from 1972 to 1973. In 1982, he obtained a Doctorate from the University of Leyden with a thesis on the Sraoša in the Zoroastrian Tradition.

Academic career 
From 1973 he lectured on Iranian studies at Utrecht University. In 1985 he became senior lecturer on Iranian Studies at Utrecht University.

His interest for the Kurdish, Pashtu and Balutschi languages and cultures led to the SOAS in London, where he lectured on Iranian languages, Zoroastrism and Sufism, between 1988 and 1993. From 1993 to 1996, he was appointed the Reader for Iranian languages and religions at the same university. His research at the SOAS focused on the oral traditions of the Iranian languages and to organize such studies, he founded the Society for Iranian Oral Studies (SIOS). From 1990 his interest turned towards the Yazidi traditions and in 1992 he undertook a journey to Iraqi Kurdistan to establish relationships with Yazidi dignitaries.

In 1996 he became the Professor on Iranian studies at the University of Göttingen where he succeeded David Neil MacKenzie. He went to Göttingen due to his interest in Yazidi culture and the fact that at the time about half of the Yazidi diaspora lived in Germany. He retired from Göttingen in 2016.

According to his own account given in his farewell interview from the university, he has seriously studied 34 languages. He has published numerous books on oriental languages and culture and has also written for the Encyclopædia Iranica.

See also 
 Khanna Omarkhali, Yazidi scholar at the University of Göttingen

References 

Living people
Academic staff of Utrecht University
Dutch orientalists
University of Amsterdam alumni
1948 births
Academic staff of the University of Göttingen
Academics of SOAS University of London
Kurdologists
Iranologists
Leiden University alumni
Utrecht University alumni